Manubhai Kotadia (31 July 1936 – 23 July 2003) was an Indian politician. He was elected to 9th Lok Sabha in 1989 on Janata Dal ticket from Amreli constituency. He was Minister of Agriculture and Power in Gujarat. He also served as Minister of State, Water Resources from December 1989 to November 1990 in VP Singh government.

In November 1990, he was one of the 64 MPs who left Janata Dal and formed Chandra Shekhar government. He was Minister of Water Resources with additional charge of Ministry of Surface Transport in Chandra Shekhar government from November 1990 to April 1991.

References

External links
 Official biographical sketch in Parliament of India website

India MPs 1989–1991
Lok Sabha members from Gujarat
Janata Party politicians
Samajwadi Janata Party politicians
Janata Dal politicians
1936 births
2003 deaths
People from Amreli district
Gujarat MLAs 1975–1980
Gujarat MLAs 1980–1985
Gujarat MLAs 1985–1990